Bruno Broughton (born 10 October 1995) is an English cricketer. He made his first-class debut on 5 April 2016 for Oxford MCCU against Northamptonshire.

References

External links
 

1995 births
Living people
English cricketers
Oxford MCCU cricketers
Place of birth missing (living people)